U.S. Route 377 (US 377) is a  north–south United States highway. Originally formed as a short spur to connect Denton, Texas with Fort Worth, Texas, it has since been extended to Oklahoma and Mexico.

Route description

Texas
The southern terminus is in Del Rio, Texas at an intersection with U.S. Route 90. It goes north of town co-signed with U.S. Route 277 for 20 miles (32 km). After splitting off, it enters Edwards County and Carta Valley. It meets SH 55 at the county seat, Rocksprings, before serving as the western terminus of SH 41. About 20 miles north of Rocksprings, the route meets with the headwaters of the South Llano River, which follows the route into Junction, Texas. It heads northeast into Kimble County, crossing the county line near Telegraph. At Junction, it meets both Interstate 10 and US 83. It then continues northeast through London, extreme southeastern Menard County, and Mason County. In Mason County, US 377 passes through Streeter before forming a concurrency with SH 29 near Grit. In Mason, SH 29 splits off to its own alignment while US 377 turns north to join U.S. Route 87.

US 87/377 head north together into Brady, where they meet US 190, the southern terminus of US 283, and SH 71. US 377 splits off to the north and heads to Mercury and crosses the Colorado River near Winchell. In Brownwood, US 377 joins with U.S. Route 67, following its routing all the way to Stephenville, where US 377 splits off on its own again. US 377 then enters Hood County, where it passes through the county seat, Granbury. It cuts the corners of both Johnson County and Parker County before entering Tarrant County and the Dallas-Fort Worth Metroplex.

US 377 crosses Interstate 20 at exit 429A in Benbrook. It then enters Fort Worth proper, meeting SH 183 and Spur 580. It runs northeast on Camp Bowie Blvd. to Interstate 30, which it begins a concurrency with. At the Interstate 35W junction, it heads north along that highway before splitting off at Exit 52A (Belknap St.). It heads due north at the Denton Highway and continues to run parallel to I-35W through many Fort Worth suburbs, including Haltom City, Watauga, Keller, Westlake, Roanoke, and Argyle. In Denton, it crosses Interstate 35E and has a brief concurrency with US 380 through the eastern portion of Denton into Crossroads.

After splitting from US 380, US 377 runs through Crossroads and north into Krugerville.  It continues through Aubrey, through Pilot Point, Tioga, and Collinsville, before having an interchange with US 82 at Whitesboro. It the heads north to cross Lake Texoma (the Red River) into Oklahoma.

Oklahoma

US 377 is co-signed with State Highway 99 for its entire Oklahoma length. US 377's first junction within Oklahoma is with SH-32 west of Kingston. The first town that US 377/SH-99 pass through is Madill, where the two highways meet US 70 and State Highway 199. The next town after that is Tishomingo, where there is a brief concurrency with SH-22. US 377/SH-99 run north from Tishomingo, having a one-mile (1.6 km) three-route concurrency with SH-7 before meeting State Highway 3 southeast of Ada. US 377/SH-99 run around the east and north sides of town. On the north side of Ada, SH-3E joins the concurrency.

After leaving Ada, US 377/SH-3E/99 pass through Byng. The three highways cross the Canadian River just south of a junction that serves as the eastern terminus of SH-39 and the western terminus of SH-56. North of Bowlegs, SH-59 joins with the other routes briefly. The next major town is Seminole, where the highways meet SH-9, and SH-3E splits off. US 377/SH-99 cross I-40 at Exit 200. The highways have a junction with US 62 in Prague.

As of 2007, the highway's northern terminus is in Stroud, Oklahoma at an indeterminate point somewhere between old Route 66 (now Oklahoma State Highway 66) and modern Interstate 44. SH-99 continues north into Kansas.

History

U.S. 377 in Texas
When US 377 was commissioned in 1930, US 77 connected Dallas, Texas with the north and south, but nearby Fort Worth lacked a direct northern connection. US 377 connected US 77 in Denton, Texas with US 81 in Fort Worth, forming a parallel route between Denton and Hillsboro, where US 81 met US 77. When the Interstate highway system was built, I-35 paralleled the Dallas–Fort Worth split with routes I-35E through Dallas (along US 77) and I-35W through Fort Worth (along US 377 and US 81). The section of US 377 in Texas north of Denton was signed as SH 99 until 1968.

The "Willis Bridge" crossing the Red River was constructed in 1968. It has guardrail damage causing the remaining bridge to be very narrow and has since been considered structurally deficient. Parts of the bridge have collapsed. An original ETA of replacement was February 2018, costing $80 million. In November 2018, the Oklahoma Transportation Commission awarded a $43 million contract to replace the bridge with a new two-lane bridge scheduled to start construction in late December 2018 or early January 2019.

U.S. 377 remained a two-lane highway between Denton and Fort Worth. It has since been widened with more construction scheduled. North of Denton, U.S. 377 is currently two lanes.

Oklahoma State Highway 99

Major intersections

Texas State Highway Loop 118
Texas State Highway Loop 118 (Loop 118) is a short and unsigned loop highway. The highway connects Highway 377 to Business State Highway 114 (Bus. SH 114) without the need for an intersection between those highways. The highway was first designated on February 4, 1941. The original route traveled from US 377 just south of Roanoke, along Oak Street, past Bus. SH 114 northward to SH 114, with State Highway Spur 118 (Spur 118) going from Loop 118 to US 377 via Denton Drive. On September 26, 1996, the stretch of Oak St. traveling from US 377 to Denton Dr. was given back to the city of Roanoke.

Related routes
 U.S. Route 77
 U.S. Route 177
 U.S. Route 277

References

External links

 Endpoints of US highway 377
 Oklahoma Terminus: US 377

Transportation in Val Verde County, Texas
Transportation in Edwards County, Texas
Transportation in Kimble County, Texas
Transportation in Menard County, Texas
Transportation in McCulloch County, Texas
Transportation in Brown County, Texas
Transportation in Comanche County, Texas
Transportation in Erath County, Texas
Transportation in Hood County, Texas
Transportation in Johnson County, Texas
Transportation in Parker County, Texas
Transportation in Tarrant County, Texas
Transportation in Denton County, Texas
Transportation in Grayson County, Texas
Transportation in Marshall County, Oklahoma
Transportation in Johnston County, Oklahoma
Transportation in Pontotoc County, Oklahoma
Transportation in Seminole County, Oklahoma
Transportation in Pottawatomie County, Oklahoma
Transportation in Lincoln County, Oklahoma
77-3
77-3
3
77-3